Clayton Holmes (born August 23, 1969 in Florence, South Carolina) is a former professional American football cornerback in the National Football League for the Dallas Cowboys. He was drafted in the third round of the 1992 NFL draft. He played college football at Carson-Newman College.

Early years
Holmes attended Wilson High School where he was a wishbone quarterback. He received All-conference honors at both quarterback and defensive back.

He also lettered in baseball, track (long jump) and tennis. He set the state record in the Long Jump.

College career
Because of grades he enrolled at North Greenville Junior College where he was the starting quarterback and a Junior College All-American.

After 2 years, he transferred to Carson-Newman College where he was converted into a cornerback.

As a junior, he contributed to a  10-0 regular season record. He led the team in both interceptions (6), passes defensed (17) and interceptions returned for a touchdown (2-school record). He established a school and a NAIA single-season record with 263 yards in interception returns. He also earned NAIA All-American honors in the long jump.

As a senior in 1991, he became one of the NAIA top football players, 
finishing second in the NAIA and tied the school single-season record with eight 8 interceptions. His 199 yards in interception returns gave him 462 for a school career-record. He received the South Atlantic Conference's Defensive Player of the Year award, Little All-American honors and also played in the Blue–Gray Football Classic.

Professional career

Dallas Cowboys
Holmes was selected by the Dallas Cowboys in the third round (58th overall) of the 1992 NFL draft. As a rookie, he was the fastest player on the team and was used mostly on special teams, finishing second on the team with 15 tackles and also registering a fumble recovery in Super Bowl XXVII.

On August 14, 1993, during the first pre-season game, he suffered a torn anterior cruciate ligament in his right knee and was lost for the season.

In 1995, he started 6 games at cornerback in place of an injured Kevin Smith, while free agent Deion Sanders reached a contract agreement with the Dallas Cowboys. That same year in November, the NFL suspended him for four games for violating the league's substance-abuse policy. A week later, the suspension was increased to one year.

While suspended, he incurred in a fifth violation of the NFL's substance abuse policy and was suspended for 4 additional games. On February 10, 1996, he was released from the team.

Miami Dolphins
Holmes signed with the Miami Dolphins on February 26, 1997, reuniting him with former Cowboys head coach Jimmy Johnson. Looking to play for the first time since November 1995, he failed another drug test that resulted in a 4-game suspension and his eventual release on October 13, 1997.

Topeka Knights
In 1999, he played for the Topeka Knights of the Indoor Football League.

Kansas Koyotes
In 2003, he signed with the Kansas Koyotes of the American Professional Football League, where he played for two seasons.

Personal life
Holmes filed suit against the NFL for involuntarily enrolling him in a drug treatment program, after he tested positive for marijuana, but his claim was dismissed.  His post-football life became a turbulent mix of personal problems and financial difficulties but he has got his life back on track since.

References

External links
Behind the Stats: An uplifting tale of tragedy

1969 births
Living people
Sportspeople from Florence, South Carolina
Players of American football from South Carolina
American football cornerbacks
North Greenville Crusaders football players
Carson–Newman Eagles football players
Dallas Cowboys players
Miami Dolphins players